José Zárate (12 November 1949 – 24 August 2013) was a Colombian footballer. He played in eleven matches for the Colombia national football team from 1975 to 1977. He was also part of Colombia's squad for the 1975 Copa América tournament.

References

External links
 

1949 births
2013 deaths
Colombian footballers
Colombia international footballers
Association football defenders
Atlético Junior footballers
Independiente Medellín footballers
Cúcuta Deportivo footballers